Ramirez is a rock band from Zagreb, Croatia. They are considered one of the most prominent Croatian bands of the so-called "new new wave" movement, which also includes bands such as Vatra.

The band was founded in 2000 and achieved notable success on several festivals even before being signed to a label. Their eponymous debut album, produced by Denis Mujadžić-Denyken, was released in October 2004. It received critical acclaim, sold well and went on to become one of the most successful Croatian albums that year. The first single off the album was "Iste cipele" (The same shoes), still one of the band's signature songs to date. Fueled by this success, the band followed it up with a series of concerts, performing with the hip pop band Elemental and opening for Hladno Pivo, among others.

In 2006, the band released their second album, Copy/Paste, also produced by Denyken and characterized by a much heavier sound.

Lead singer and frontman Aljoša Šerić started an acoustic-oriented side project, Pavel, and released an album of the same name in 2007.

Their third album, Divovi i kamikaze, came out in 2009. A single off it, "Sedam", was used in a campaign to help raise public awareness about HIV (in collaboration with HUHIV - the Croatian Association for HIV).

The band's last single from the album, "Fantastično, bezobrazno", was the subject of some controversy after its video was censored and banned from Croatian national television (HRT) due to scenes of violence and alcohol abuse.

The band finished recording their fourth studio effort in the fall of 2010, and the first single, "Ti i ja" (You and me) had been performing well on Croatian mainstream charts as of November 2010. The new album, named Svijet je lijep (The world is beautiful) was released on 21 March 2011. Ramirez also recently released their new single, "Da li me voli" (Does she love me).

Members 
Aljoša Šerić - vocals, acoustic guitar
Saša Jungić - electric guitar, vocals
Goran Leka - drums
Tomislav Šušak - bass, vocals
Ozren Ratković - formerly bass

Discography

Albums 
 Ramirez, Menart, 2004
 Copy/Paste, Menart, 2006
 Divovi i kamikaze (Giants and kamikazes), Menart, 2009
 Svijet je lijep (The world is beautiful), Menart, 2011

Singles 
 Iste cipele (The same shoes), 2004
 Sve je OK (Everything is OK), 2004
 Otjeraj me (Chase me away), 2005
 Barcelona, 2005
 Ništa posebno (Nothing special), 2006
 Loš (treća) (Bad (the third)), 2006
 Copy/Paste, 2006
 Učini nešto danas (Do something today), 2009
 Sedam (Seven), 2009
 Fantastično, bezobrazno (Fantastic, rude), 2009
 Ti i ja (You and me), 2010
 Da li me voli (Does she love me), 2011

External links
 Myspace
 MTV Hrvatska

Croatian rock music groups
Musicians from Zagreb
Musical groups established in 2000